The Great Yorkshire Show (GYS) is an agricultural show which takes place on the Great Yorkshire Showground in Harrogate, North Yorkshire in the North of England annually from the second Tuesday of July until the following Thursday. It is organised and run by the Yorkshire Agricultural Society (YAS). Since the demise of the Royal Show the GYS has been the largest agricultural show in England, however within the UK it is surpassed by both the Royal Welsh Show and the Royal Highland Show. The show is highly successful and the Society generated income of £9.6 million in 2016. A new Hall at the showground, costing £11 million, opened in 2016 and produced more than £1 million of income in its first year.

History 
The history of the GYS is intimately connected with that of the Yorkshire Agricultural Society (YAS).
 1837: The YAS was founded; its primary aim was stated as "... to hold an Annual Meeting for the Exhibition of Farming Stock, Implements &c., and for the General Promotion of Agriculture."
 1838: The first YAS Show was held in the Barrack Yard at Fulford, near York. The numbers attending were not recorded, but the event was counted a success; police had to use their batons to restore order among the large numbers of visitors when they began to force their way in without paying.
 Originally intended as a peripatetic event, the Show moved to Leeds, Northallerton and Kingston upon Hull in subsequent years.
 1842: The show returned to York. This is the first year for which attendance figures are available — the Show in 1842 had a paid attendance of 6,044. By 1843 the YAS Show had become known as the "Great Yorkshire Show", apparently by popular acclamation rather than in any official sense.
 The GYS continued to be held in various places around Yorkshire until 1950.
 1915–1919: Cancelled due to the First World War.
 1920: The GYS was held jointly with the Royal Agricultural Society of England in Darlington.
 1931: Huddersfield 
1933: The GYS was held in Marton in Middlesbrough.
 1940–1948: Cancelled due to the Second World War.
 1948: By now the YAS was coming to the conclusion that the expenses involved in setting up a new showground every year were becoming prohibitive.
 1949: It was decided that a permanent showground be acquired.
 1950: The last peripatetic show, in Malton. The YAS bought a site at Hook Oval in Harrogate for £16,500.
 1951: From here on, Hook Oval in Harrogate has been the permanent site for the GYS. The 1951 the attendance figure was nearly 54,000.
 2001: Cancelled due to the outbreak of Foot and mouth disease in Britain.
 2006: The most successful show so far in terms of attendance figures, with 135,111 visitors.
 2008: The show was attended by the Queen to celebrate the 150th occasion on which the Show had been held.
 2011: The show came close to the record with 135,086 visitors.
2012: This show (the 154th) was cancelled on Tuesday 10 July 2012 after only one day, due to exceptional rain which had made the showground car parks unsafe. Organisers stated that the decision had been taken "reluctantly". This was the first cancellation due to weather. (Earlier cancellations had been due to war or foot and mouth disease.)  An old bulldozer towed horse trailers out of muddy ground.
2017: The show was held on Tuesday 11 – Thursday 13 July 2017. This was the 159th show.
2018: This was the 160th show and was held on Tuesday 10 – Thursday 12 July 2018.
2020: The show (the 162nd), which would have been held on the Tuesday 14 - Thursday 16 July 2020, was cancelled on Monday 23 March 2020 due to the COVID-19 pandemic. This is the first show to be fully cancelled since 2001.

Showground 

The Great Yorkshire Showground is situated off Railway Road, on the outskirts of Harrogate. These include

 Main grandstand and show-ring
 Country Pursuits arena (featuring Hounds and Birds of Prey)
 Flower Show
 "White Rose" grandstand and show-ring
 Housing for cattle, sheep, pigs and other livestock
 Multi-purpose conference and exhibition halls (known as the "Yorkshire Event Centre")
 Dining and function facilities (known as "Pavilions of Harrogate")
 Office accommodation for the Yorkshire Agricultural Society, which has its headquarters at the showground

The showground facilities are used all the year round for various functions and events ranging from the Great Yorkshire Show to antiques fairs, trade shows, business conferences and wedding receptions. It is estimated that one million people visit the showground per year.

Notes

References 
 Hall, Vance (1987). A History of the Yorkshire Agricultural Society 1837—1987. London: Batsford.

External links 
GYS website
Yorkshire film archive: Great Yorkshire show 1957
Great Yorkshire Show on ITV Local Yorkshire
Great Yorkshire Show on Flickr
Yorkshire Agricultural Society
Falconry UK Ltd. at the Great Yorkshire Show

Agricultural shows in Yorkshire
Events in Harrogate
Tourist attractions in Harrogate
Festivals established in 1838
Events in Yorkshire
1838 establishments in England